Kubusdaelda is a steep, ice-filled ravine between Kubus Mountain and Klevekampen Mountain in the Filchner Mountains of Queen Maud Land, Antarctica. It was plotted from surveys and air photos by the Sixth Norwegian Antarctic Expedition (1956–60) and named Kubusdaelda (the cube dell) in association with Kubus Mountain.

References

Canyons and gorges of Antarctica
Landforms of Queen Maud Land
Princess Astrid Coast